A green building council (GBC) is any national non-profit, non-government organization that is part of a global network recognized by the World Green Building Council. A green building council's goal is to promote a transformation of the built environment towards one that is sustainable (buildings and cities that are environmentally sensitive, economically viable, socially just and culturally significant).

List of recognised GBCs 
As of December 2020, there were at least 39 nations with established GBCs, 10 recognized as "emerging" members, and others in the development process. As of the end of 2020, there were around 70 GBCs at various stages of development.

The Green Building Council Russia (RuGBC) formed in 2009 and is seeking Emerging Status. Growth in the CIS countries accompanies growth in the number of green construction projects in those countries, that is, those certified to LEED or BREEAM standard.

The 39 established councils are

 Argentina Green Building Council
 Green Building Council of Australia
 Austrian Sustainable Building Council
 Green Building Council Brasil
 Canada Green Building Council
 Chile Green Building Council
 China Green Building Council
 Colombia Green Building Council
 Green Building Council Costa Rica
 Croatia Green Building Council
 Dutch Green Building Council
 Emirates Green Building Council
 Green Building Council Finland 
 France Green Building Council (this NGO merged with the French HQE Association in 2016 to form the HQE Association-France GBC, which brought together more than 200 members)''
 German Sustainable Building Council
 Guatemala Green Building Council
 Hong Kong Green Building Council
 Indian Green Building Council
 Green Building Council Indonesia
 Irish Green Building Council
 Italy Green Building Council
 Jordan Green Building Council
 Japan Green Building Consortium
 Korea Green Building Council
 Malaysia Green Building Council
 Mexico Green Building Council
 New Zealand Green Building Council
 Pakistan Green Building Council
 Panama Green Building Council
 Peru Green Building Council
 Philippine Green Building Council
 Polish Green Building Council
 Singapore Green Building Council
 Green Building Council of South Africa
 Green Building Council España
 Sweden Green Building Council
 Taiwan Green Building Council
 Turkish Green Building Council
 
 UK Green Building Council
 U.S. Green Building Council

See also
Sustainable architecture
Sustainable city

References 

 
International environmental organizations
Sustainable building